Ridgeland Correctional Institution is a state prison for men located in Ridgeland, Jasper County, South Carolina, owned and operated by the South Carolina Department of Corrections.  

The facility was opened in 1995, and houses 1165 inmates at medium security.

References

Prisons in South Carolina
Buildings and structures in Jasper County, South Carolina
1995 establishments in South Carolina